Covington is an incorporated town in Wyoming County, New York. The population was 1,231 at the 2010 census. The town was named after General Leonard Covington.

The Town of Covington is on eastern border of the county.

History 
The Town of Covington was created in 1817 from the Towns of Perry and Le Roy (in Genesee County).

Geography

The Oatka Creek flows through the Wyoming Valley in the town.

Demographics

As of the census of 2000, there were 1,357 people, 473 households, and 377 families residing in the town. The population density was 51.9 people per square mile (20.1/km2). There were 491 housing units at an average density of 18.8 per square mile (7.3/km2). The racial makeup of the town was 97.27% White, 0.15% African American, 0.37% Native American, 0.29% Asian, 0.29% from other races, and 1.62% from two or more races. Hispanic or Latino of any race were 0.96% of the population.

There were 473 households, out of which 34.5% had children under the age of 18 living with them, 67.0% were married couples living together, 7.2% had a female householder with no husband present, and 20.1% were non-families. 15.4% of all households were made up of individuals, and 4.4% had someone living alone who was 65 years of age or older. The average household size was 2.87 and the average family size was 3.15.

In the town, the population was spread out, with 27.6% under the age of 18, 7.3% from 18 to 24, 30.3% from 25 to 44, 24.6% from 45 to 64, and 10.2% who were 65 years of age or older. The median age was 37 years. For every 100 females, there were 104.1 males. For every 100 females age 18 and over, there were 106.3 males.

The median income for a household in the town was $40,446, and the median income for a family was $41,683. Males had a median income of $28,676 versus $23,417 for females. The per capita income for the town was $15,745. About 5.5% of families and 8.1% of the population were below the poverty line, including 17.1% of those under age 18 and 3.9% of those age 65 or over.

Notable people
S. Park Coon, former Wisconsin Attorney General, served in the 2nd Wisconsin Volunteer Infantry Regiment as colonel in American Civil War

Communities and locations in Covington 
Boyds Corners – A location in the northeast town corner.
Covington – A hamlet, also known as Covington Center, located at Route 246.
LaGrange – A hamlet on Route 246 on the south town line.
Orrs Corners – A location in the northeast corner of the town.
Pearl Creek – A hamlet near the north town line on Route 19.
Peoria – A hamlet on Route 63 near the eastern town line.
Quinlans Corners – A location in the northeast town corner.
Spragues Corners – A hamlet between Covington and Pearl Creek.
Wyoming Valley – A valley on the western edge of the town, containing Oatka Creek.

References

External links
 Town of Covington website

Populated places established in 1817
Towns in Wyoming County, New York
1817 establishments in New York (state)